The economy of Hong Kong is a highly developed free-market economy. It is characterised by low taxation, almost free port trade and a well-established international financial market. Its currency, called the Hong Kong dollar, is legally issued by three major international commercial banks, and is pegged to the US dollar. Interest rates are determined by the individual banks in Hong Kong to ensure that they are market driven. There is no officially recognised central banking system, although the Hong Kong Monetary Authority functions as a financial regulatory authority.

Its economy is governed under positive non-interventionism, and is highly dependent on international trade and finance. For this reason it is regarded as among the most favorable places to start a company. In fact, a recent study shows that Hong Kong has come from 998 registered start-ups in 2014 to over 2800 in 2018, with eCommerce (22%), Fintech (12%), Software (12%) and Advertising (11%) companies comprising the majority. The Economic Freedom of the World Index listed Hong Kong as the number one territory, with a score of 8.91, in 2019.

Hong Kong's economic strengths include a sound banking system, virtually no public debt, a strong legal system, ample foreign exchange reserves with assets of US$481.6 billion represent over six times the currency in circulation or about 46 per cent of Hong Kong dollar M3 as at the end of March 2022, rigorous anti-corruption measures and close ties with mainland China. The Hong Kong Stock Exchange is a favourable destination for international firms and firms from mainland China to be listed, due to Hong Kong's highly internationalised and modernised financial industry. Additional advantages include the city's capital market in Asia, its size, regulations and available financial tools, which are comparable to London and New York City.

Hong Kong's gross domestic product had grown 180 times between 1961 and 1997. Also, the GDP per capita rose by 87 times within the same time frame. Its economy is slightly larger than Chile's or Romania's and its GDP per capita at purchasing power parity was the eleventh highest globally in 2022. By the latter measure, its GDP per capita was higher than those of the United States and the Netherlands, and slightly lower than Brunei.  In 2009, Hong Kong's real economic growth fell by 2.8% as a result of the Great Recession.

By the late 20th century, Hong Kong was the seventh largest port in the world and second only to New York City and Rotterdam in terms of container throughput. Hong Kong is a full Member of the World Trade Organization. The Kwai Chung container complex was the largest in Asia, while Hong Kong shipping owners were second only to those of Greece in terms of total tonnage holdings in the world. The Hong Kong Stock Exchange is the sixth largest in the world, with a market capitalisation of about US$3.732 trillion.

Hong Kong has also had an abundant supply of labour from the regions nearby. A skilled labour force coupled with the adoption of modern British/Western business methods and technology ensured that opportunities for external trade, investment, and recruitment were maximised. Prices and wages in Hong Kong are relatively flexible, depending on the performance and stability of the economy of Hong Kong.

Hong Kong raises revenues from the sale and taxation of land and through attracting international businesses to provide capital for its public finance, due to its low tax policy. According to Healy Consultants, Hong Kong has the most attractive business environment within East Asia, in terms of attracting foreign direct investment (FDI). In 2013, Hong Kong was the third largest recipient of FDI in the world.

Hong Kong ranked fourth on the Tax Justice Network's 2011 Financial Secrecy Index. The Hong Kong Government was the fourth highest ranked Asian government in the World Economic Forum's Network Readiness Index (NRI), a measure of a government's information and communication technologies in 2016, and ranked 13th globally.

Economic predictions
Since the 1997 handover, Hong Kong's economic future became far more exposed to the challenges of economic globalisation and the direct competition from cities in mainland China. In particular, Shanghai claimed to have a geographical advantage. The Shanghai municipal government dreamt of turning the city into China's main economic centre by as early as 2010.

Positive non-interventionism 

Hong Kong's economic policy has often been cited by economists such as Milton Friedman and the Cato Institute as an example of laissez-faire capitalism, attributing the city's success to the government having a relatively low level of involvement in the economy. However, others have argued that the economic strategy is not at all adequately characterised by the term laissez-faire. They point out that there are still many ways in which the government is involved in the economy, some of which exceed the degree of involvement in other capitalist countries. For example, the government is involved in public works projects, healthcare, education, and social welfare spending. Further, although rates of taxation on personal and corporate income are low by international standards, unlike most other countries Hong Kong's government raises a significant portion of its revenues from land leases and land taxation. All land in Hong Kong is owned by the government and is leased to private developers and users on fixed terms, for fees which are paid to the state treasury. By restricting the sale of land leases, the Hong Kong government keeps the price of land at what some consider as artificially high prices and this allows the government to support public spending with a low tax rate on income and profit.

Economic freedom 

Hong Kong was ranked as the world's 2nd freest economy in the Index of Economic Freedom of The Heritage Foundation in 2020 after Singapore. The index measures restrictions on business, trade, investment, finance, property rights and labour, and considers the impact of corruption, government size and monetary controls in 183 economies. Hong Kong is the only economy to have scored 90 points or above on the 100-point scale, achieved in 2014 and 2018.
In 2021 the Heritage Foundation removed Hong Kong as a separate entity from China from its list of freest economics of the world citing increasing interference from the Chinese government in Hong Kong's governmental system and democratic process. With this Hong Kong, along with Macao, lost a position they had held in the index since the index's inception in 1995. At the time of the removal from the index, the founder of the Heritage Foundation indicated that while the SARs "offer their citizens more economic freedom than is available to the average citizen of China", these economic policies are still "ultimately controlled from Beijing".

Economic data 

The following table shows the main economic indicators in 1980–2021 (with IMF staff estimates in 2022–2027). Inflation below 5% is in green.

GDP
 GDP – nominal (2021): HK$2,869,682 million
 GDP – real growth rate (2021): +6.3%
 GDP – per capita (2021): HK$387,110
 GDP – composition by sector (2020):
 Financial services: 23.4%
 Trading and Logistics: 19.8%
 Professional Services and Other Producer Services: 11.5%
 Tourism: 0.4%
 Other Sectors: 44.9%

Gdp ppp\per capita in $2020 59520, Gdp ppp 444,86milliards\billions dollars

Labour
 Labour force (2021): 3.87 million -1.2% year-on-year
 Persons Engaged in various sectors (Dec 2021):
 Social and personal services: 537,322
 Import/export trade and wholesale: 439,500
 Professional and business services: 387,702
 Accommodation and food services: 253,527
 Retail: 251,421
 Finance and insurance: 240,274
 Unemployed (2021): 200,300 5.2%
 Underemployed (2021): 98,900 2.6%

2022–23 fiscal year budget
 Total Revenues: HK$715.9 billion
 Total Expenditures: HK$807.3 billion
 Deficit: HK$91.4 billion
 Government debt at 31 March 2022: HK$56.68 billion

Trade

Selective data in HK$ for Main Countries/Territories (2021)

 Total Trade: $10,268.4 billion +25.3% year-on-year, trade balance -$347.1 billion
With mainland China: $5,385.4 billion (52.4% share), +26.8% year-on-year
With Taiwan: $691.3 billion (6.7% share), +37.1% year-on-year
With USA: $516.3 billion (5.0% share), +19.1% year-on-year
 Imports: $5,307.8 billion +24.3% year-on-year
From mainland China: $2,433.4 billion (45.8% share), +26.5% year-on-year
From Taiwan: $547.5 billion (10.3% share), +35.0% year-on-year
From Singapore: $413.8 billion (7.8% share), +31.7% year-on-year
 Exports: $4,960.6 billion +26.3% year-on-year
To mainland China: $2,951.9 billion (59.5% share), +27.0% year-on-year
To USA: $309.6 billion (6.2% share), +19.6% year-on-year
To Taiwan: $143.8 billion (2.9% share), +46.0% year-on-year

Trade with Macau

As at 2015, Macau is Hong Kong's second largest export destination, occupying 6.1% of Hong Kong's total exports. The amount of export totaled US$8.4B, with broadcasting equipment, jewelry, and precious metal watches as the major products. On the other hand, Hong Kong is Macau's largest export destination. Totaled USD 774M, with precious metal watches, jewelry, trunks and cases as the major trading products, the exports to the Hong Kong forms 53% of Macau's total exports. 
Since 2018, Hong Kong and Macau have been connected via road by the Hong Kong–Zhuhai–Macau Bridge.

Poverty 
The international poverty line is a monetary threshold under which an individual is considered to be living in poverty. This threshold is calculated using Purchasing Power Parity. According to the World Bank, the international poverty line was most recently updated in October 2015, in which it was increased from $1.25 per day to $1.90 per day using the value of 2011 dollars. Raising this threshold helps account for changes in costs of living, which directly effects individuals ability to obtain basic necessities across countries.

Recent figures show that 1.37 million people are living below the poverty line and struggling to survive on HK$4,000 (US$510) per month for a one-person household, HK$9,800 for a two-person household earning, and HK$15,000 or a three-person household. The poverty rate in Hong Kong hit a high of 20.1%, but recent efforts by government programs have lowered this number to 14.7%.

In December 2012, the Commission on Poverty (CoP) was reinstated to prevent and alleviate poverty with three primary functions; analyze the poverty situation, assist policy formulation and to assess policy effectiveness. Cash handouts have been credited with alleviating much of the poverty, but the extent in which poverty has been alleviated is still questionable. Although cash handouts raise households above the poverty line, they are still struggling to meet certain standards as the cost of living in Hong Kong steadily increases.

Coupled with these cash payments, statutory minimum wage is set to increase for a second time in the past 10 years. Statutory Minimum Wage (SMW) came into existence on 1 May 2011 and the SMW rate has been HK$34.5 per hour since May 2017. The Legislative Council in Hong Kong most recently approved the revision on the SMW rate to increase to HK$37.5 per hour, effective 1 May 2019. Although the total statistics for Hong Kong show declining poverty, child poverty has recently increased .3 percentage points, up to a total of 23.1%, as a result of larger households due to children staying with their elderly parents. With economic growth projected to slow in the coming years, poverty becomes an increasingly pressing issue.

Beyond benefiting the younger generation through cash handouts and minimum wage increases, expanded elderly allowances have been implemented to increase disposable incomes of the elderly population that can no longer work. As of 1 February 2019 the amount payable per month for eligible elderly population became HK$1,385 in an effort to raise households incomes living with elderly tenants. Although Hong Kong has become one of the largest growing cities in the world, much of the population is struggling to keep up with the rising costs of living.

One of the largest issues affecting low income families is the availability of affordable housing. Over the past decade, residential Hong Kong property prices have increased close to 242%, with growth finally starting to decelerate in 2019. Considering housing is a basic necessity, prices have continuously increased while disposable incomes remain virtually unchanged. As the amount of affordable housing diminishes, it has become much harder for families to find homes in their home country. Public housing programs have been implemented by the government, but delayed construction and growing waitlists have not helped to the extent they planned for. Recent results from a Hong Kong think tank show that by 2022, the average citizen could wait up to 6 years for public housing. Evidence shows that the availability of affordable housing has declined, forcing households to spend more on shelter and less on other necessities. These issues can lead to worse living conditions and imbalanced diets, both of which pose problems beyond just financial well-being.

Financial markets

Stock exchange

The Hong Kong Stock Exchange is the sixth largest in the world, with a market capitalisation of about US$3.732 trillion as of mid-2017. In 2006, the value of initial public offerings (IPO) conducted in Hong Kong was second highest in the world after London. In 2009, Hong Kong raised 22 percent of IPO capital, becoming the largest centre of IPOs in the world. The exchange is the world's 10th largest by turnover and third largest in China.

Bond market

Exchange rates

See also

 Mainland and HK Closer Economic Partnership Arrangement (CEPA)
 Mainland and Macau Closer Economic Partnership Arrangement (CEPA)
 Economy of China
Manufacturing in Hong Kong
 Economy of East Asia
 Individual Visit Scheme
 John James Cowperthwaite
 Positive non-interventionism
 The Hongs
 Taiwan Miracle
 Poverty Campaign: Speak Up
 Seamen's strike of 1922
 Nylonkong

References

External links
Hong Kong Economy
Hong Kong Government
Hong Kong Economic Structure, The Economist, 10 January 2007. Retrieved 24 February 2007.
The Hong Kong Experiment by Milton Friedman
Economic History of Hong Kong Catherine R. Schenk, University of Glasgow
Hong Kong Census and Statistics Department
 Hong Kong Forex Nows (IBTimes HK)
World Bank Summary Trade Statistics Hong Kong
Tariffs applied by Hong Kong as provided by ITC's Market Access Map, an online database of customs tariffs and market requirements

 
Hong Kong
Asia-Pacific Economic Cooperation